The Tonbridge Half Marathon is an English annual road running event that was introduced on 25 September 2011.  Organised by the Tonbridge Lions Club and Tonbridge Rotary Club, it attracted over 800 runners in its inaugural event.

Dame Kelly Holmes attended the first event in 2011 as guest starter.

Course
The course circumnavigates the roads of Tonbridge and the Kent countryside. The route starts at K College on Brook Street and takes runners out of Tonbridge along Molescroft Way, Upper Hayesden Lane, and Ensfield Road to the village of Leigh. Runners pass through the village then head along the B2027 towards Hildenborough, turning left into Watts Cross Road and then left again at every junction back into Leigh. The final leg of the course takes runners back through Leigh village centre onto Ensfield Road, Hayesden Lane, then leading back to Brook Street to the finish.

Past winners

References

Tourist attractions in Kent
Sport in Kent
Half marathons in the United Kingdom
Athletics competitions in England
Tonbridge